"Sea of Heartbreak" is a song written by Paul Hampton and Hal David and recorded by Don Gibson in 1961. The song reached #2 on the Billboard Hot Country Singles & Tracks chart.

Content
The song describes the feelings of lost love, and compares them to being lost in a metaphorical sea of intensely sad emotion (to an, at least in the chorus and in the overall impression, surprisingly cheery tune). It contains three verses with a chorus at the beginning and ending, and in between verses. As well as a bridge before the third verse.
The chorus lines are:-

Sea of heartbreak, lost love an' loneliness;
Memories of your caress, so divine
I wish you were mine again, my dear.
I am on this sea of tears:
Sea of heartbreak.

Chart performance

Kenny Price version 

Kenny Price recorded the song in 1972, and peaked at number 24 on the country charts in the USA. It was included on his album of the same name.

Chart performance

Ronnie McDowell version

"Sea of Heartbreak" was also a single by the American country music artist Ronnie McDowell. Released in 1989, it was the first single from the album American Music. The song reached #39 on the Billboard Hot Country Singles & Tracks chart.

Chart performance

Jimmy Buffett/George Strait version

In 2004, Jimmy Buffett recorded a version for his License to Chill album. George Strait was featured on this rendition.

Other cover versions
Johnny Cash recorded the song for his Grammy-winning 1996 album Unchained. Cash's daughter, Rosanne Cash, covered the song in 2009 as a duet with Bruce Springsteen on her album The List. British pop group The Searchers recorded a version in 1964 for their album It's The Searchers. The Everly Brothers covered the song on their 1967 album, The Hit Sound of the Everly Brothers. In 1982, Poco went to #35 in the USA on the Adult Contemporary chart with their version.
Leo Sayer covered the song in his 1984 album . 
The alternative rock band Meat Puppets recorded a version of the song that was featured 2019 album Dusty Notes. Lynn Anderson released the song as a single in 1979 from her “Outlaw Is Just a State of Mind” album and it peaked at number 33 on Billboard’s Country Single Chart. Yugoslav rock band Džentlmeni released a Serbo-Croatian version of the song, entitled "Slomljena srca" ("Broken Hearts"), in 1969, the song becoming a big hit in Yugoslavia. Their version appeared in the 1998 Serbian film Barking at the Stars.  Poco included their version of the song on their 1982 album Cowboys and Englishmen. Czech country singer Michal Tučný released a version of the song, entitled "Snídaně v trávě" ("Breakfast on the Grass"), with lyrics by Zdeněk Rytíř, in 1980.

References

External links

1961 singles
1972 singles
1979 singles
1989 singles
1961 songs
2009 singles
Don Gibson songs
Johnny Cash songs
The Everly Brothers songs
Kenny Price songs
Lynn Anderson songs
Ronnie McDowell songs
Jimmy Buffett songs
George Strait songs
Rosanne Cash songs
Bruce Springsteen songs
The Searchers (band) songs
Poco songs
Songs with lyrics by Hal David
RCA Records singles
Curb Records singles
Warner Records singles
Songs written by Paul Hampton